Mister Frost is a 1990 supernatural thriller film starring Jeff Goldblum and directed by French filmmaker Philippe Setbon, who also co-wrote the screenplay with Derry Hall, Brad Lynch and Louise Vincent. It co-starred Kathy Baker and Alan Bates.

Synopsis
A police detective named Felix Detweiler visits the palatial English estate of Mister Frost, whose first name is never given, to investigate a report of a dead body. Frost, with very little prompting, cheerfully admits that he has many bodies buried in his yard.

Frost is arrested and ultimately placed in an asylum located in France. During this time the police are unable to establish his identity. The detective leaves his job and becomes obsessed with Frost and the 24 corpses dug up from his garden.

After not speaking for two years after his arrest, Frost's long silence is broken when he encounters Sarah Day, a doctor at the asylum. Frost refuses to speak with anyone but her, then tells Day that he is, in fact, Satan. He reveals that he plans to goad her into murdering him.

Detweiler believes it is true that Frost is "the devil himself" and pleads with the doctor to heed his warnings. Day naturally does not accept this, but strange things begin to happen around her and Frost demonstrates on multiple occasions feats that would be difficult to dismiss as simple sleight of hand.

The turning point for Day comes when her brother, after being confined to a wheelchair for most of his life, suddenly regains use of his legs.  Her patients and colleagues also begin to exhibit unnatural changes in themselves.  Gradually, Day is convinced that Frost is telling the truth and, to spare others from harm, agrees to kill him.

Moments before she shoots him to death, Frost tells Day that he now knows he is more powerful than anything or anyone in the world, and he thanks Day for believing in him. As Frost expounds on this, Day shoots him. For a moment she looks blankly at the body before saying, with Frost's voice, "Stronger than passing time." As Day is led away by the police, Detweiler arrives. Day refuses to speak, arousing Detweiler's suspicion, and the film ends.

Cast
 Jeff Goldblum as Mister Frost
 Kathy Baker as Dr. Sarah Day
 Alan Bates as Felix Detweiler
 Jean-Pierre Cassel as Inspector Carelli
 Roland Giraud as Dr. Reynhardt
 François Négret as Christopher

Release 
In the Netherlands, the film has been released on DVD by distributor Dutch Film Works.

Reception 
While not a hit, Mister Frost was generally reviewed well.  The film occasionally appears on television.

References

External links
 
 
 Dutch Film Works catalogue

1990 films
1990 crime thriller films
1990s English-language films
British independent films
British crime thriller films
The Devil in film
French independent films
English-language French films
1990s British films
1990s French films